The 2000 World Rally Championship was the 28th season of the FIA World Rally Championship. The season consisted of 14 rallies. The drivers' world championship was won by Marcus Grönholm in a Peugeot 206 WRC,  breaking the streak of Tommi Mäkinen who had won the previous 4 titles for Mitsubishi, ahead of Richard Burns and Carlos Sainz. The manufacturers' title was won by Peugeot, ahead of Ford and Subaru.

Calendar

The 2000 championship was contested over fourteen rounds in Europe, Africa, South America and Oceania.

Teams and drivers

Toyota not counted for the 2000 season in the Manufacturers' championship due to their withdrawal from the sport in 1999 to concentrate on F1.

Results and standings

Drivers' championship

Manufacturers' championship

Events

External links 

 FIA World Rally Championship 2000 at ewrc-results.com

World Rally Championship
World Rally Championship seasons